Sackville can refer to several different communities in the Canadian province of Nova Scotia located along the Sackville River.  No community has simply "Sackville" as an official name.

 Lower Sackville
 Middle Sackville
 Upper Sackville